LSK is an English singer, songwriter and record producer, born Leigh Stephen Kenny.

LSK, or lsk, may also refer to:
Lillestrøm SK, a Norwegian football club from the city of Lillestrøm
Ljungskile SK, a Swedish football club located in Ljungskile, a town within Uddevalla Municipality
LSK, the ICAO code for Aurela, a charter airline based in Vilnius, Lithuania
LSK, the National Rail code for Liskeard railway station, Cornwall, UK

See also